Padbury Senior High School was a government, co-educational, secondary day school located in Padbury, a suburb north of Perth, Western Australia.

Padbury Senior High School offered a comprehensive education to students from Year 8 to Year 12. Situated in the North West Metropolitan corridor, the school drew its students mainly from the suburbs of Hillarys, Padbury and Hepburn Heights. The school was of modern design and was constructed to cater for at least 1000 students.

On 27 October 2010, the Education Minister announced that Padbury Senior High School would close at the end of 2011 due to declining enrolments.

The site of the former senior high school is now occupied by the Statewide Services Centre for the Department of Education.

History
The school opened in 1987 with Year 8 students drawn from various primary schools in the surrounding area. The school was named after Walter Padbury - one of Western Australia's early pioneers.

The school was upgraded in 2006 following the closure of nearby Craigie Senior High School at the end of 2003. Students from Craigie were enrolled at either Padbury or Belridge Senior High School and both schools received upgrades to cope with higher student numbers.

In 2010, it was decided that Padbury Senior High would close at the end of 2011 due to declining enrolments, and an expected student population of under 200. Students enrolled at Padbury Senior High School would move to either of the nearby schools Duncraig Senior High and Belridge Senior High. Students who attended the schools Autism Extension Program (AEP) were transferred to Ocean Reef Senior High School to continue their enrolment.

Campus
The Padbury Senior High School campus was located in a suburban area. Facilities of the school included a Performing Arts Theatre, a Visual Arts Centre, a Photography Laboratory, a Pastoral Care Centre and specialist facilities in Music, Home Economics, Design and Technology, Business Education, Computing and Physical Education. In addition, the school had two ovals, tennis courts and cricket nets.

Special programs
Padbury Senior High School had a number of special programs running within the school, such as:
Marine Studies - including an internationally accredited scuba training program
School Based Academic Extension
Autism Education Unit
Arts Scholarship Program

See also

List of schools in the Perth metropolitan area

References

External links
 Padbury Senior High School website

Public high schools in Perth, Western Australia
Educational institutions established in 1987
1987 establishments in Australia